Brassica oleracea is a plant species from family Brassicaceae that includes many common cultivars used as vegetables, such as cabbage, broccoli, cauliflower, kale, Brussels sprouts, collard greens, Savoy cabbage, kohlrabi, and gai lan.

Its uncultivated form, wild cabbage, native to coastal southern and western Europe, is a hardy plant with high tolerance for salt and lime. However, its intolerance of competition from other plants typically restricts its natural occurrence to limestone sea cliffs, like the chalk cliffs on both sides of the English Channel. Wild B. oleracea is a tall biennial plant that forms a stout rosette of large leaves in the first year. The leaves are fleshier and thicker than other Brassica species—an adaptation that helps it store water and nutrients in its difficult growing environment.

A 2021 study suggested that the Eastern Mediterranean Brassica cretica was the origin of domesticated B. oleracea. Genetic analysis of nine wild populations on the French Atlantic coast indicated their common feral origin, deriving from domesticated plants escaped from fields and gardens.

Etymology
'Brassica' was Pliny the Elder's name for several cabbage-like plants.

Cultivation and uses 

B. oleracea has become established as an important human food crop plant, used because of its large food reserves, which are stored over the winter in its leaves. It is rich in essential nutrients including vitamin C. It has been bred into a wide range of cultivars, including cabbage, broccoli, cauliflower, brussels sprouts, collards, and kale, some of which are hardly recognizable as being members of the same genus, let alone species. The historical genus of Crucifera, meaning "cross-bearing" in reference to the four-petaled flowers, may be the only unifying feature beyond taste.

Researchers believe it has been cultivated for several thousand years, but its history as a domesticated plant is not clear before Greek and Roman times, when it was a well-established garden vegetable. He reports the antipathy of the cabbage and the grape vine, for the ancients believed cabbages grown near grapes would impart their flavour to the wine.

A diet rich in cruciferous vegetables (e.g., cabbage, broccoli, cauliflower) is linked to a reduced risk of several human cancers.

Origins 
According to the Triangle of U theory, B. oleracea is very closely related to five other species of the genus Brassica. A 2021 study suggested that Brassica cretica, native to the Eastern Mediterranean, particularly Greece and the Aegean Islands, was the closest living relative of cultivated B. oleracea, thus supporting the view that its cultivation originated in the Eastern Mediterranean region, with later admixture from other Brassica species.

The cultivars of B. oleracea are grouped by developmental form into several major cultivar groups, of which the Acephala ("non-heading") group remains most like the natural wild cabbage in appearance. For a list of these groups, see the table of cultivars.

History 

Through artificial selection for various phenotype traits, the emergence of variations of the plant with drastic differences in looks occurred over centuries. Preference for leaves, terminal bud, lateral bud, stem, and inflorescence resulted in selection of varieties of wild cabbage into the many forms known today.

Impact of preference 
 The preference for the eating of the leaves led to the selection of plants with larger leaves being harvested and their seeds planted for the next growth. Around the fifth century BC, the formation of what is now known as kale had developed.
 Preference led to further artificial selection of kale plants with more tightly bunched leaves, or terminal bud. Somewhere around the first century AD emerged the phenotype variation of B. oleracea known as cabbage. 
 Phenotype selection preferences in Germany resulted in a new variation from the kale cultivar. By selecting for fatter stems, the variant plant known as kohlrabi emerged around the first century AD. 
 European preference emerged for eating immature buds, selection for inflorescence. Early records in 15th century AD, indicate that early cauliflower and broccoli heading types were found throughout southern Italy and Sicily, although these types may not have been resolved into distinct cultivars until about 100 years later.
 Further selection in Belgium in lateral bud led to Brussels sprouts in the 18th century.

Genetics in relation to taste 
The TAS2R38 gene encodes a G protein-coupled receptor that functions as a taste receptor, mediated by ligands such as PROP and phenylthiocarbamide that bind to the receptor and initiate signaling that confers various degrees of taste perception.  Bitter taste receptors in the TS2R family are also found in gut mucosal and pancreatic cells in humans and rodents. These receptors influence release of hormones involved in appetite regulation, such as peptide YY and glucagon-like peptide-1, and therefore may influence caloric intake and the development of obesity. Thus, bitter taste perception may affect dietary behaviors by influencing both taste preferences and metabolic hormonal regulation.

Three variants in the TAS2R38 gene – rs713598, rs1726866, and rs10246939 – are in high linkage disequilibrium in most populations and result in amino acid coding changes that lead to a range of bitter taste perception phenotypes. The PAV haplotype is dominant; therefore, individuals with at least one copy of the PAV allele perceive molecules in vegetables that resemble PROP as tasting bitter, and consequently may develop an aversion to bitter vegetables. In contrast, individuals with two AVI haplotypes are bitter non-tasters. PAV and AVI haplotypes are the most common, though other haplotypes exist that confer intermediate bitter taste sensitivity (AAI, AAV, AVV, and PVI). This taste aversion may apply to vegetables in general.

Cultivars

References

External links 

PROTAbase on Brassica oleracea (Brussels sprouts)
PROTAbase on Brassica oleracea (cauliflower and broccoli)
Video Overview of Brassica oleracea: from Untamed Science

oleracea
 
Plants described in 1753
Taxa named by Carl Linnaeus
Flora of Europe